Birgitte Caroline "Nena" von Schlebrügge (born January 8, 1941) is a Mexican-born Swedish and American fashion model from the 1950s and 1960s. She started her high-fashion modelling career in London in 1957 and continued in New York City in 1958 at the Ford Modeling Agency. In New York, she worked at Vogue and Harper's Bazaar. 

She was briefly married to Timothy Leary in 1964-1965. After marrying the Buddhist scholar Robert Thurman in 1967 she adopted the name Nena Thurman. The actress Uma Thurman is their daughter. 

She studied to become a psychotherapist and served as Managing Director of Tibet House US. She is now the Executive Chairwoman of the Menla retreat and health spa in upstate New York.

Family
Schlebrügge's father belonged to German nobility. Her Swedish mother Birgit Holmquist served as Axel Ebbe's model for Famntaget ("The Embrace"), a 1930s statue of a nude woman that overlooks the harbor of Smygehuk in Sweden. Her paternal half-sister was the grandmother of German-Swedish football player Max von Schlebrügge. She grew up in Sweden, and is also of Danish descent.

Career

Modeling
In 1955, at the age of 14, Nena was discovered by Vogue photographer Norman Parkinson when he was on a tour in Stockholm, Sweden. In 1957, Nena moved to London, United Kingdom, to pursue a career in high-fashion modeling. She found immediate success and was invited to come to New York City by Eileen Ford of the Ford Modeling Agency to continue her modelling career.

In the snow storm of March 1958, at the age of 17, she arrived in New York City on the Queen Mary. In New York City, she continued her career as a top model, working at Vogue and Harper's Bazaar. She was photographed by many fashion photographers, including Gleb Derujinsky.

Acting
In 1967, she had a part in the Edie Sedgwick film Ciao! Manhattan. The film took four years to make; and drastic changes from the original story were made, causing the filmmakers to remove many scenes, including Nena's, shot in 1967. These deleted scenes can be found on the DVD version.

Open Center and Tibet House
From 1987 to 1989, Nena was the Program Director at the New York Open Center. From 1991 to 2002 she served as the Managing Director of Tibet House US in New York City. Tibet House US was founded in 1986 by the Thurmans, Philip Glass, and Richard Gere, at the behest of the Dalai Lama. Nena oversaw the construction of Tibet House US and the educational programming. With Philip Glass, she initiated the annual benefit concert at Carnegie Hall and the annual benefit auction at Christie's. She was executive producer of The First 30 Years of Tibet House U.S. film, directed by John Halpern.

Since 2001, Nena has been the Managing Director of the Tibet House US-owned Menla Mountain Retreat and is now the Executive Chairwoman, where she has overseen the construction of a state-of-the-art Tibetan medicinal spa facility and business in the Catskill Mountains in Phoenicia, New York. She is also a psychotherapist.

Personal life
Nena married Timothy Leary in 1964 at the Hitchcock Estate (commonly known as "Millbrook"). D. A. Pennebaker documented the event in his 12-minute film You're Nobody Till Somebody Loves You. Charles Mingus played piano at the wedding ceremony. The marriage lasted a year before von Schlebrügge divorced Leary in 1965.

In 1967, she married Indo-Tibetan Buddhist scholar and ex-monk Robert Thurman, whom she had met at Millbrook. In the same year, Nena and Robert's first child, Ganden Thurman, was born. In 1970, Robert and Nena's second child, Uma Thurman, was born. They have two more sons: Dechen (b. 1973) and Mipam (b. 1978). The children grew up in Woodstock, New York in a house built by the Thurmans on nine acres of land purchased with Nena's inheritance. In addition to their four children, the pair have seven grandchildren, including the actress Maya Hawke.

References

External links
Tibet House US
Menla Mountain Retreat
You're Nobody Till Somebody Loves You
 First 30 Years of Tibet House
 Tibet House US Channel

American activists
American female models
American women chief executives
People from Ulster County, New York
People from Massachusetts
Converts to Buddhism
People from Mexico City
Mexican emigrants to the United States
American people of German descent
American people of Swedish descent
American people of Danish descent
Mexican people of German descent
Mexican people of Danish descent
Mexican people of Swedish descent
1941 births
Living people
American Buddhists
21st-century American women